Beharoopia is a 1971 Bollywood fantasy film directed by Rajesh Nanda. The film stars Helen.

Cast
Helen.   
Hiralal   
Dheeraj Kumar   
Snehlata

Music

External links
 

1971 films
1970s Hindi-language films
1970s fantasy films
Films scored by Usha Khanna
Indian fantasy films